Volodymyr Dmytrovych Konovalchuk (born 23 November 1965) was a Ukrainian football midfielder.

Career
Konovalchuk began playing football in the Soviet Top League for FC Shakhtar Donetsk. In 1992, he joined FC Kremin Kremenchuk for the first season of the Ukrainian Premier League.

Career statistics

References

External links
 
 Profile on official Vorskla site 
 

1965 births
Living people
FC Kremin Kremenchuk players
FC Metalurh Zaporizhzhia players
FC Vorskla Poltava players
FC Hirnyk-Sport Horishni Plavni players
Ukrainian footballers
Association football midfielders